Since the start of the  Formula One season, drivers have to choose an available starting number before entering their first Grand Prix. Drivers carry this number throughout their Formula One career.

The FIA have also issued temporary numbers to drivers that are exceptions to this rule, for example if a driver withdraws from a race and a reserve driver takes their place then they receive a team-allocated number, this is also the case of free-practice-only drivers. Some examples of those numbers are 36 (used by Antonio Giovinazzi in two races), 40 (used by Paul di Resta in one race), 45 (used by André Lotterer and Nyck de Vries in one race each), 46 (used by Will Stevens in one race), 47 (used by Stoffel Vandoorne in one race) and 51 (used by Pietro Fittipaldi in two races).
For instance, Jenson Button's number 22 would have been available for re-allocation in 2019 after his departure from full-time racing in 2016, but an appearance in the 2017 Monaco Grand Prix replacing Fernando Alonso (who was participating in the 2017 Indianapolis 500 on that weekend instead), meant that his number could not be reassigned until 2020 at the earliest. Yuki Tsunoda subsequently picked that number (22) for the 2021 Formula One World Championship.

The reigning Formula One World Drivers' Champion can elect to use their allocated permanent number or car number 1 during the year following their title. The first driver to exercise that right under the new regulations was Sebastian Vettel in 2014. The number then went unused for seven seasons, with Lewis Hamilton keeping his permanent number 44 after his title wins in 2014, 2015, 2017, 2018, 2019 and 2020, and Nico Rosberg retiring after his championship win in 2016. Max Verstappen is using number 1 in 2022 and 2023 after his titles in 2021 and 2022.

The number 17 was used by Jules Bianchi in 2014 before his crash at the Japanese Grand Prix. Following his death, the number was retired as a mark of respect.

Formula One driver numbers
The following lists all Formula One driver numbers which were claimed as career numbers since the  season.

Notes

References

Formula One-related lists